Abu Shusha was a Palestinian Arab village in the Haifa Subdistrict. It was depopulated during the 1947–48 Civil War in Mandatory Palestine on 9 April 1948 during the Battle of Mishmar HaEmek.

History
The village was located just west of Tel Shush, which recent examination shows may date from the  Early Bronze Age. It has also been suggested as the location of the Roman town of Gaba Hippeon, founded in the year 61 BCE, by the Roman governor of Syria,  L. Marcius Philippus.  It was an episcopal see in the fifth-sixth centuries, and ceramics from the Byzantine era have been found here.

Ottoman era
In 1870 Victor Guérin  described it as a small village. The slopes of the hill were covered with many piles of overturned materials from buildings, and on the highest point was the remains of an old tower.

In 1882, the PEF's Survey of Western Palestine (SWP)  described "a little hamlet on the edge of the plain, with a spring to the east."

British Mandate era
In the British Mandate of Palestine period, in the 1922 census of Palestine Abu Shusheh had a population of 12; all Muslims,  increasing sharply  in the 1931 census when it was counted with Esh Shuqeirat and Arab el Saayda, to 831; still all Muslim, in a total of  155 houses.

In 1926 a small group of Jews from the Hashomer Hatzair movement settled in a caravanserai located on Tell Abu Shusha, before they moved to a location a few hundred yards south and established Mishmar HaEmek.

In the 1945 statistics  Abu Shusha had a population of 720, all Muslims, with a total of 8,960 dunams of land. Of this, 931 dunums were plantations or irrigable land, 4,939 were for  cereals,  while 3,090 dunams were classified as uncultivable land.

In 1940s a resident called Salim Ibn Hussein moved to Syria and returned in 1947, infused with Arab nationalism and led the armed guard of Abu Shusha during the 1947–1948 Civil War in Mandatory Palestine.

In 1946, members of the Anglo-American Committee of Inquiry on Palestine visited Abu Shusha as part of educational tour, aimed at examining the political, economic and social conditions in Mandatory Palestine before crafting a solution to the problem of Jewish immigration and settlement. After visiting the nearby Jewish kibbutz Mishmar HaEmek, the British delegate, Richard Crossman wrote: “I’ve never met a nicer community anywhere.” By contrast, two hundred yards down the road, he later wrote: “Abu Shusha, the stenchiest Arab village I have ever seen,” where Crossman was treated to tea “on the [earthen] floor of a filthy hovel.”

1948, aftermath

Few months into the 1947–1949 Palestine war, on 5 April 1948, the Arab Liberation Army (ALA) reached the area and used Abu Shusha among other villages as a base of operations to raid Mishmar HaEmek. The Haganah General Staff (HGS) instructed the Golani Brigade: "You must tell the following villages ... that we cannot assure their safety and security, and that they must evacuate forthwith." Among the four villages were Abu Shusha, Daliyat al-Rawha' and Al-Rihaniyya. According to Ben-Gurion, a delegation of Mishmar HaEmek leaders came to him on the 8th or 9 April, and told him that "it was imperative to expel the Arabs [in the area] and to burn the villages."

By the 11 April, the village was empty, and 1 Battalion in the Palmach blew up 30 houses in Al-Kafrayn and Abu Shusha in order to block the return of the villagers. Following the 1948 war, the area was incorporated into the State of Israel.

In 1992, Walid Khalidi described the area: "The only remaining sign of the village is the debris of houses, overgrown with cactuses. The grain mill is gone. On the hilly lands around the site, olive trees grow in a fenced-in area that serves as a pasture. The adjacent lands in Marj ibn Amir are planted in various crops, especially cotton."

Two village histories have been written about Abu Shusha and the Arab Turkoman; one in 1987 by Alya Khatib, and one in 1999 by Faisal al-Shuqayrat.

References

Bibliography

  
 
  (p. XXV)
Flapan, S. "The Palestinian Exodus of 1948" in 16, no. 4 (Sum. 87): 3–26. Simha Flapan records HaShomer HaTzair member Eliezer Bauer, who was also a member of the Mapam Arab Department reporting during a discussion that the villagers of Abu Zrik and Abu Shusha were arrested or driven out and the villages were then destroyed.

External links
Welcome To Abu Shusha
 Abu Shusha (Haifa),  Zochrot
Survey of Western Palestine, Map 8:  IAA, Wikimedia commons 
Abu Shusha from the Khalil Sakakini Cultural Center
 Abu Shusha – District of Haifa, dr Khalidi

Arab villages depopulated prior to the 1948 Arab–Israeli War
District of Haifa